Appleton West High School (or AWHS, formerly known as Appleton Senior High School or Appleton High School) is a comprehensive public secondary school located in Appleton, Wisconsin that serves students in the ninth through twelfth grades. The school was founded in 1915 under the name Appleton Senior High School, but the current facility was constructed in 1938, and the name was changed to West High in 1967 following the construction of Appleton East High School. The current principal is Mark McQuade, Ed.D, who was awarded the Herb Kohl Educational Foundation Principal Leadership Award in 2022.

One of the three public four-year high schools in the Appleton Area School District (AASD), West High also offers two charter academies: Appleton Technical Academy (A-TECH) and the Renaissance School of the Arts (RSA). These institutions are fully accredited by the Wisconsin Department of Public Instruction. Appleton West is also a member of the Fox Valley Association athletic conference.

Appleton West received the Wisconsin RtI Center School of Distinction Award for three years in a row from 2014 to 2016; as of the 2019–20 school year, they remain recognized for behavior and merit. According to the Fox Valley Association, 40 students of West High have been given a "Student-Athlete Spotlight" for excellent performance since the 2014–15 school year.

As of the 2019–20 school year, West High had an enrollment of 1,336 students and 69.51 classroom teachers (on an FTE basis) for a student-teacher ratio of 19.22. There were 420 students (31.44% of students) eligible for free lunch and 86 (6.44% of students) eligible for reduced-cost lunch.

History
In 1881, Ryan High School was constructed following the decision to unify Appleton into one school district. On January 26, 1904, Ryan High School was destroyed in a fire and rebuilt as Union High School in the same year, at the cost of $92,000 (~$2,690,700 today). In 1938, students were relocated to the newly built Appleton High School so that Union High School could become the Carrie E. Morgan Elementary School. In 1967, construction on Appleton East High School was completed, and Appleton High School would become West High as a result. In the same year, following the death of Carrie E. Morgan, the elementary school in her name would be converted into the Morgan Administration Building and, as of today, remains as such.

On March 13, 1970, an arson fire caused by a Molotov cocktail would set Appleton West ablaze, damaging one classroom and a faculty room as a result. Although a perpetrator was never caught, some believe that it had to do with a rise in political climate at the time, supported by similar happenings from radical activist movements such as the Weather Underground Organization and the Student Strike of 1970.

West High's mascot is the 'Terror', a fictional animal representing a genetic hybrid between a wolf and a fox, as the school is situated in between the Wolf and Fox Rivers. This mascot would be depicted for the first time in 1944 as an orange canine on a blue background, but would receive multiple redesigns in 1969, 1982, 1989, 1991, and 1993 until finally deciding on a minimalist design of a Terror head and the letters 'AW' in a vibrant orange and blue.

In August 2014, a new football stadium was built on school grounds, but lacked the proper seating requirements issued by the FVA. Home games were played at Lawrence University's Banta Bowl, as well as Neinhaus Field, Appleton North, Appleton East, and Einstein Middle School until the seating requirement was satisfied.

Structure 
As of the 2019–20 school year, Appleton West has a modified school day that lasts from 8:15 AM to 3:50 PM. The beginning and end of each day (8:15 AM to 9:20 AM / 3:15 PM to 3:50 PM) is reserved for 'Student Support Time', or SST, that serves as a study hall, followed by an eight-period block schedule that alternates daily (commonly referred to as the "Monday-Thursday" and "Tuesday-Friday" schedules). Periods 1-4 are taken on Mondays and Thursdays, while Periods 5-8 are taken on Tuesdays and Fridays. Each period lasts 75 minutes, and there is a 30-minute homeroom period that serves as a 'lunch hour' and/or additional study time every day from 12:05 PM to 12:35 PM. Students are not required to attended classes on Wednesdays, as those days are fully dedicated to SST, but are expected to continue working from home using Chromebooks issued by the AASD; however, RSA students are given mandatory class periods on Wednesdays.

Following AASD standards and Wisconsin State Statute 118.33, students must earn 23 high school credits. This includes:

 English Language Arts (ELA) - 4.0 Credits
 1.0 ELA 9 or *ELA 9
 1.0 ELA 10 or *ELA 10
 1.0 ELA 11 Course Option
 1.0 ELA 12 Course Option
 Science - 3.0 Credits
 1.0 Physical Science
 1.0 Life Science
 1.0 Science Course Elective
 Social Studies - 3.0 Credits
 1.0 Civics
 1.0 World Studies
 1.0 U.S. History
 Mathematics - 3.0 Credits
 Physical Education - 1.5 Credits
 0.5 Freshman Physical Education
 Fine Arts - 1.0 Credit
 "To include art, music, theatre, or humanities when not used for social studies."
 Health - 0.5 Credit
 0.5 Health
 Financial Literacy - 0.5 Credit
 Electives - 6.5 Credits

Students enrolled in A-TECH or RSA are provided methods to obtain credits in necessary fields. For students who are failing, at-risk, or unable to complete these standards in the required time, West High provides an alternative education program that allows students to gain credits through Edgenuity courses and independent/directed study programs.

Extracurricular Activities

Athletics 
Appleton West currently provides football, baseball, basketball, tennis, golf, soccer, softball, swimming and diving, track and field, volleyball, wrestling and lacrosse as options for student athletes. It is typical for students to maintain a high GPA before being able to participate in athletic tryouts, practices, and events.

Football 
In 1992, the varsity football team won the Division 1 State Championship.

Baseball 
The baseball team has won the state title seven times (1975, 1976, 1982, 1988, 1991, 1995, and 2004).

Basketball 
In the 1969–70 school year, the Appleton West Terrors, led by coach Richard Emanuel, won the WIAA Boys Basketball Tournament undefeated.

Lacrosse 
Independent from the FVA, members of Appleton United Lacrosse are recruited from all three AASD high schools.

Clubs 
As of the 2019–20 school year, AWHS had over 35 clubs.

Fine Arts 
The Appleton West Theatre, an all-student group directed by Kreston B. Peckham, perform live shows to be presented in the West auditorium. Each year, a stage play is presented in the Fall, and a musical is presented in the Spring; students are invited to audition to perform or work as backstage crew members. As well as hosting daily rehearsals after school hours, the Appleton West Theatre constructs and paints their own sets from scratch over the weekends leading up to the opening day. All proceeds from ticket sales and concessions go back into the group budget for future events.

On February 4, 1978, the Appleton West Choral Department took first place at the St. Norbert Swing Choir Carnival.

Notable alumni
John Bradley, a United States Navy Hospital Corpsman and recipient of the Navy Cross, Purple Heart Medal, and Combat Action Ribbon for raising the first U.S. flag at Iwo Jima during World War II.
Brian Butch, current radio color commentator for the Wisconsin Herd of the NBA G League and former professional basketball player for the 2003 McDonald's All-American Basketball Team. 
Donald Dafoe, current Chief of Transplantation Surgery at the University of California Irvine Medical Center, former Director of the Kidney and Pancreas Transplant Center, Director of Surgical Education, holder of the Eris M. Field Endowed Chair in Diabetes Research at the Cedars-Sinai Medical Center, and former medical director of the California Transplant Donor Network.
John Francis Doerfler, current Bishop of the Roman Catholic Diocese of Marquette.
Catherine Ebert-Gray, former United States Ambassador to Papua New Guinea, Vanuatu, and the Solomon Islands.
Matt Erickson, professional baseball player for the Milwaukee Brewers.
Daniel John Felton, current Bishop of the Roman Catholic Diocese of Duluth.
Harold Vernon Froehlich, former Chief Judge of the Wisconsin Circuit Court, 66th Speaker of the Wisconsin State Assembly, Vice Chair of the Wisconsin Government Accountability Board, U.S. Congressman, and member of the House Judiciary Committee.
Danny Jansen, professional baseball player for the Toronto Blue Jays.
William Beverly Murphy, former CEO of the Campbell Soup Company.
David Prosser, Jr., former Justice of the Wisconsin Supreme Court.
Jacob Royster, current Student Body President of Fox Valley Technical College.
Kathi Seifert, former Executive Vice President of Kimberly-Clark.
Brad Smith, current President and Chief Legal Officer of Microsoft.

References

External links

 

High schools in Appleton, Wisconsin
Educational institutions established in 1938
Public high schools in Wisconsin
1938 establishments in Wisconsin